The A.E.M. Fútbol Club, commonly known as A.E.M., is a Mexican football club based in State of Mexico. The club was founded in 2015, and currently plays in the Tercera División de México.

Players

Current squad

References 

Association football clubs established in 2015
Football clubs in the State of Mexico
2015 establishments in Mexico
Tercera División de México